Statistics of Qatar Stars League for the 1990–91 season.

Overview
Al-Arabi Sports Club won the championship.

References
Qatar - List of final tables (RSSSF)

1990–91 in Asian association football leagues
1990–91 in Qatari football